The Pampa micropolitan [statistical] area is a micropolitan area in the Texas Panhandle that covers two counties – Gray and Roberts. As of the 2000 census, the region had a population of 23,631 (though a July 1, 2009, estimate placed the population at 22,952).

Counties
Gray
Roberts

Communities
Alanreed (unincorporated)
Lefors 
McLean 
Miami
Pampa (principal city)
Hoover (unincorporated)
Wayside (unincorporated)

Demographics
As of the census of 2000, there were 23,631 people, 9,155 households, and 6,324 families residing around Pampa. The racial makeup of the area was 82.69% White, 5.64% African American, 0.93% Native American, 0.38% Asian, 0.02% Pacific Islander, 7.97% from other races, and 2.37% from two or more races. Hispanic or Latino of any race were 12.64% of the population.

The median income for a household in the region was $38,080 and the median income for a family was $45,210. Males had a median income of $32,763 versus $21,885 for females. The per capita income for the Pampa micropolitan area was $18,813.

See also
List of cities in Texas
Texas census statistical areas
List of Texas metropolitan areas

References

 
Geography of Gray County, Texas
Geography of Roberts County, Texas